Hans-Georg Aschenbach (born 20 October 1951) is a former East German ski jumper.

In 1969 he became junior world champion, and two years later won his first national title. He won the FIS Ski Flying World Championships in 1973. In 1974 he won the Four Hills Tournament, and both ski jumping events at the FIS Nordic World Ski Championships in Falun. Owing to these achievements he was named the East German sportspersonality of the year. He sat out most of 1975 due to a knee injury, but recovered by the 1976 Winter Olympics, where he took the gold medal in the individual normal hill event.

Aschenbach retired right after the Olympics to work as a military and sports doctor. In 1988, while serving as the physician of the East German ski jumping team, he defected into West Germany, where he worked as an orthopedic surgeon.

References

German male ski jumpers
1951 births
Living people
Ski jumpers at the 1972 Winter Olympics
Ski jumpers at the 1976 Winter Olympics
Olympic ski jumpers of East Germany
Olympic gold medalists for East Germany
Olympic medalists in ski jumping
National People's Army military athletes
FIS Nordic World Ski Championships medalists in ski jumping
German sportspeople in doping cases
Medalists at the 1976 Winter Olympics
People from Schmalkalden-Meiningen
East German physicians
East German defectors
Sportspeople from Thuringia